Four Hours to Kill! is a 1935 American drama film directed by Mitchell Leisen and starring Richard Barthelmess.

Plot
Taft, a policeman, has fugitive murderer Tony Mako in custody and in handcuffs, two thousand miles from the prison from which Mako escaped. With four hours to kill, Taft takes his prisoner to a theater where the cop's wife, Mae, is a hostess.

Mae is an unfaithful schemer. She is trying to extort $200 from coat-check kid Eddie, insinuating she is pregnant. Eddie doesn't want his fiancee Helen to hear this, true or otherwise, so he tries to raise the money to pay Mae's blackmail. Eddie is also suspected of stealing an expensive piece of jewelry.

Mako made the journey this far in the hope of gaining revenge against Anderson, a man who informed on him. After telling Taft he would prefer a quick death to a painful execution, Mako breaks free and shoots Anderson before being shot by Taft, dying the kind of death he wanted. Eddie is cleared and now free to marry Helen, while Mae is taken away to jail.

Cast
 Richard Barthelmess as Tony Mako
 Joe Morrison as Eddie
 Gertrude Michael as Mrs. Sylvia Temple
 Helen Mack as Helen
 Dorothy Tree as Mae Danish
 Roscoe Karns as Johnson
 Ray Milland as Carl Barrett
 Charles C. Wilson as Taft
 Henry Travers as Mac Mason
 Noel Madison as Anderson
 Paul Harvey as Capt. Seaver
 Olive Tell as Mrs. Madison
 Lee Kohlmar as Pa Herman

Production
Paramount bought the film rights to the stage play in December 1934.

Reception
The New York Times called it "a gripping, although extremely theatrical, melodrama with a neatly dovetailed plot, a uniformly excellent cast and well paceed direction".

Proposed remake
In 1944 Paramount Pictures announced it would create a new film adaptation of Small Miracle, the play that was the basis of Four Hours to Kill. Leisen was to direct the new version; Alan Ladd in the lead. The project was not realized.

In 1947 Jack LaRue presented a stage version.

References

External links
 
 Four Hours to Kill at TCMDB
 Four Hours to Kill! review at Mystery File
 Review of film at Variety

1935 films
1935 drama films
American black-and-white films
American drama films
American films based on plays
Films directed by Mitchell Leisen
Paramount Pictures films
1930s English-language films
1930s American films